Mathilda Taylor Beasley, OSF (November 14, 1832 - December 20, 1903) was a Black Catholic educator and religious leader who was the first African American nun to serve in the state of Georgia. She founded a group of African-American nuns and one of the first U.S. orphanages for African-American girls.  

In 2004, she was posthumously named a Georgia Woman of Achievement.

Biography
She was born in New Orleans, Louisiana on November 14, 1832. She was baptized as a Catholic in 1869, possibly in preparation for her marriage to Abraham Beasley, a wealthy free black restaurant owner in Savannah, who died in 1877. 

With Catherine and Jane Deveaux, Beasley educated slaves in her home in Savannah, Georgia before the Civil War although this was illegal at the time. 

Later in life, after becoming a Franciscan nun in England, Beasley returned to the United States and founded a group of African-American sisters in Georgia, called the Sisters of the Third Order of St. Francis. Beasley attempted to affiliate her group with the Franciscan Order but was ultimately unsuccessful. 

She also started one of the first orphanages in the United States for African-American girls, the St. Francis Home for Colored Orphans. 

She died on December 20, 1903.

Legacy 
In 1982 the Mother Mathilda Beasley Park was dedicated in Savannah on a tract of land east of East Broad Street. A Georgia Historical Marker documenting her life was erected in 1988 at her home in Savannah. In 2014 her cottage, formerly located at 1511 Price Street, was relocated into Mother Mathilda Beasley Park as an interpretive center.

In 2004, Beasley was inducted into the Georgia Women of Achievement hall of fame.

Further reading

References

External links
 

1832 births
1903 deaths
People from New Orleans
African-American educators
19th-century American Roman Catholic nuns
Franciscan nuns
African-American Roman Catholic religious sisters and nuns
African-American Catholic superiors general